Breckland Group Holdings Ltd v London & Suffolk Properties Ltd [1989] BCLC 100 is a UK company law case, concerning the right of a majority shareholder to litigate in the company's name.

Facts
A majority shareholder attempted to start litigation in the company's name against the managing director. The board challenged the litigation, arguing it had no authority to do so even with a shareholder resolution.

Judgment
Harman J held that the litigation could not be continued. After noting that the responsibility of the board is collective, not individual and the power of the board is invested in the whole, he said,

Significance
This was a contentious opinion, and most academic treatises view the law to be that in fact a majority shareholder may by ordinary resolution bring litigation. This is seen to follow implicitly from the rule in Foss v Harbottle, and the House of Lords judgment in Alexander Ward v Samyang.

See also
UK company law
Foss v Harbottle
Alexander Ward v Samyang [1975] 2 All ER 424
Danish Mercantile Co Ltd v Beaumont

Notes

References
KW Wedderburn, 'Control of Corporate Actions' (1989) 52 Modern Law Review 401

United Kingdom company case law
1989 in case law
1989 in British law
High Court of Justice cases